This is a list of airlines currently operating in Malawi.

See also
 List of airlines
 List of defunct airlines of Malawi
 List of companies based in Malawi

Malawi
Airlines
Airlines
Malawi